The National Statistician is the Chief Executive of the UK Statistics Authority, and the Head of the UK Government Statistical Service. The office was created by the Statistics and Registration Service Act 2007. The UK Statistics Authority announced that Sir Ian Diamond would take over as National Statistician in October 2019, following the retirement of John Pullinger in June 2019.

Status
They are de facto permanent secretaries but do not use that title. As the ONS incorporated the OPCS, the Director also became the Registrar General for England and Wales. Following the implementation of the Statistics and Registration Service Act 2007, the General Register Office continues to be part of a ministerially accountable department, becoming a part of the Identity & Passport Service in the Home Office and the post of Registrar-General is now held by its head.

National Statisticians
 The first Director of ONS was Tim Holt. Subsequent Directors have had this additional title, the National Statistician. 
 The second Director was Len Cook, who had previously held a similar post in New Zealand. 
 He was succeeded by Dame Karen Dunnell on 1 September 2005.
 Jil Matheson succeeded Karen Dunnell on 1 September 2009.
 John Pullinger succeeded Jil Matheson on 1 July 2014 and retired in June 2019.
 Ian Diamond succeeded John Pullinger on 22 October 2019.

References

External links
UK Statistics Authority's National Statistician homepage

 
Civil servants in the Office for National Statistics